The 2000–01 season was the 95th season in the existence of RC Strasbourg and the club's ninth consecutive season in the top flight of French football. In addition to the domestic league, Strasbourg competed in this season's edition of the Coupe de France and Coupe de la Ligue. The season covered the period from 1 July 2000 to 30 June 2001.

Season summary
Despite winning the Coupe de France, Strasbourg were relegated in bottom place.

First-team squad
Squad at end of season

Left club during season

Competitions

Overall record

Division 1

League table

Results summary

Results by round

Matches

Coupe de France

Coupe de la Ligue

Sources
RSSSF - France 2000/01
The season on racingstub.com

References

RC Strasbourg Alsace seasons
Strasbourg